John Gilpin was featured as the subject in a well-known comic ballad of 1782 by William Cowper, entitled The Diverting History of John Gilpin. Cowper had heard the story from his friend Lady Austen.

Gilpin was said to be a wealthy draper from Cheapside in London, who owned land at Olney, Buckinghamshire, near where Cowper lived. It is likely that he was a Mr Beyer, a linen draper of the Cheapside corner of Paternoster Row. The poem tells how Gilpin and his wife and children became separated during a journey to the Bell Inn, Edmonton, after Gilpin loses control of his horse which bolts and carries him ten miles farther to the town of Ware.

A number of sites commemorate the exploits of John Gilpin, most notably Gilpin's Gallop, a street in the village of Stanstead St Margarets. This was said to have been on the original route taken by the horse and his unfortunate rider.

John Gilpin's Ghost was a ballad (1795) by John Thelwall. The John Gilpin  clipper of 1852 was also named after him. A former public house in Cambridge was named John Gilpin. A sculpture by Angela Godfrey, which was inspired by Cowper's poem about Gilpin now sits in Fore Street, Edmonton, London.

References

External links

Bartleby.com – the poem in full
Folkplay.info – the poem in full

18th-century English businesspeople
People from the City of London
Year of birth missing
Year of death missing